Chariot is a 2022 American science fiction comedy film written and directed by Adam Sigal. The film stars John Malkovich, Thomas Mann, Rosa Salazar, Shane West, Scout Taylor Compton and Vernon Davis.

The film was released to theatres and video on demand on April 15, 2022 by Saban Films.

Cast
 John Malkovich as Dr. Karn
 Thomas Mann as Harrison Hardy
 Rosa Salazar as Maria Deschaines
 Shane West as Rory Calhoun
 Scout Taylor Compton as Lauren Reitz / Oliver
 Vernon Davis as David Reece
 Chris Mullinax as Old Man
 Joseph Baena-Schwarzenegger as Cory

Production
On January 26, 2021, filming began in Little Rock, Arkansas.

In February 2022, Saban Films acquired distribution rights to the film and the title is now called Chariot.

Reception
On the review aggregator website Rotten Tomatoes, 13% of 16 critics' reviews are positive, with an average rating of 3.90/10.

Odie Henderson of RogerEbert.com awarded the film one and a half stars and wrote, "...by making all the wondrous ideas surrounding his protagonist’s main story seem mundane, Sigal undermines his own universe."

Luke Y. Thompson of The A.V. Club graded the film a C- and wrote, "Ultimately, Chariot certainly doesn’t lack ambition, just execution."

Julian Roman of MovieWeb gave the film a negative review and wrote, "Chariot is a hollow and absurd exploration of the afterlife. What begins as an interesting metaphysical dilemma devolves into gimmicky theatrics that make no sense whatsoever."

Alexander Harrison of Screen Rant awarded the film two stars out of five and wrote, "Ultimately, what moments do flash in Chariot are not enough to overcome the feelings of confusion and aggravation its viewers are left with..."

Sumner Forbes of Film Threat rated the film a 7 out of 10 and wrote, "Chariot may not blow anyone away with its inventiveness, but it’s right at home in the family of darkly funny science fiction films that are enjoyable to watch late at night."

References

External links
 

American science fiction comedy films
Films shot in Arkansas
2022 films
2022 science fiction films
2022 comedy films
2020s English-language films
2020s American films